Gopinath Jiu Temple  is located in Fandauk, Nasirnagar Upazila, Brahmanbaria District, Bangladesh. The architectural style and beauty of this temple is a testament to the architecture of the Mughal period. The temple is almost many years old.The temple was established by Jamini Rajan Paul, Ramani Kanta Paul & Pramod Ranjan Paul, sons of Ramkanai Paul and Jashodamoyee Paul.  The temple is currently managed by the International Society for Krishna Consciousness (ISKCON). The worship of the followers of traditional religions and the footsteps of local and foreign devotees are prominent

History 
Gopinath Jiu Temple is a traditional temple at Fandauk in Nasirnagar upazila of Brahmanbaria district. The temple is very ancient. This temple is about four storeys high. The design of the temple is an architectural example of the Mughal period. This temple was established in Bengal in 1360. The tradition of this temple is 100 of years old. This temple has five peaks above.

Temple 
Radha Krishna and Jagannath and Chaitanya Mahaprabhu are the main deities in this temple. Every part of the temple has Mughal architectural designs. This temple has five peaks. God is worshiped in the main temple and the buildings next to it are the abodes of the saints and the Chauchala Nat temple on the other side.

Festival 
Among the main festivals of the temple are: Janmashtami of Sri Krishna, Janmashtami of Radha Rani, Gaur Purnima. Rathyatra, bathing festival of Jagannath Dev. Dol Jatra, Rasapurnima, Bhagavata Discussion, etc.

Architectural design 
The various parts of the temple are full of designs and crafts and have Mughal architectural designs.

References 

Hindu temples in Chittagong Division